One More Chance is a 2007 Filipino romantic drama film directed by the award-winning director Cathy Garcia-Molina and starring John Lloyd Cruz and Bea Alonzo. The film was written by Vanessa R. Valdez and Carmi Raymundo and produced by Charo Santos-Concio and Malou N. Santos. In the film, it tells a love story between Popoy and Basha who are lovers since their college days and they became a couple. Suddenly, as they try to maintain their relationship, they have misunderstandings to each other due to their ambitions in life. As they almost break apart, the two will find solutions to repair their love.

One More Chance was released on November 14, 2007 by Star Cinema and grossed over ₱152.7 million nationwide, making it a box office success and received several year-end accolades. A sequel, A Second Chance, was released in November 2015. The 4K digital remaster of the film was released through iTunes on September 14, 2015 and a limited theatrical run on October 4, 2017.

Plot
College sweethearts Popoy (John Lloyd Cruz) and Basha (Bea Alonzo) are a longtime couple working for the same construction firm. After five years together, Basha starts to feel smothered by domineering and controlling Popoy who frequently makes decisions for both of them. Popoy's nagging and overbearing attitude eventually takes a toll on Basha, and she decides to break up with him. She also resigns from the firm where they both work, he as an engineer and she as an architect.
 
Popoy's friends try to help him move on, and he meets Trisha (Maja Salvador), a singer at a bar that Popoy and his friends frequent. He eventually spirals out of control, affecting his work and relationships with his friends. Meanwhile, Basha attempts to find herself after the breakup. She eventually meets another architect named Mark (Derek Ramsay) who offers her a job at their small firm. Accepting the offer, Basha begins to feel the professional and creative freedom she was denied in her previous work.   
 
Things take a turn for the worse when Mark, as a friendly gesture, drives Basha to a dinner party with her friends after being MIA for nearly three months. Popoy misconstrues their relationship and thinks that Mark and Basha are a couple, which sets him off.  
 
Some time after, both Popoy and Basha are in a better place. Popoy is now in a relationship with Trisha, while Basha continues to thrive in her career. Popoy's aunt Edith (Nanette Inventor) and her fiance Willie (Al Tantay) arrive home from the United States, intending to claim Popoy and Basha's promise to build their dream house together. This forces the two to work together on the house. They remain civil to each other, but their close proximity brings out some feelings in both.

Circumstances surrounding their common friends further lead Popoy and Basha to confront more hurt and anger regarding their breakup. When Basha delivers the final design plans of Nanay Edith and Tito Willie's house to Popoy's apartment, Basha apologizes for breaking Popoy's heart and they end up spending the night together.

At Mark's wedding, Basha tells him that she wished she could have prevented hurting Popoy. Mark tells her that breaking up was the right thing to do in the long run, that sometimes couples need to grow independently of each other because "it takes grownups to make relationships work."

Meanwhile, Trisha notices that Popoy has still not moved on from Basha. Popoy admits that while he loves Trisha, he also still loves Basha. They break up.

Popoy turns to his friends Krizzy (Dimples Romana) and Kenneth (James Blanco). They point out that the breakup (of Popoy and Basha) was also hard on Basha, not just on him. "She was the only one brave enough to face the truth that there is something wrong with your relationship," Krizzy says. Kenneth suggests that Popoy was hurt because he could not bear to give Basha what she needed. The couple make Popoy realize that Basha needed to take care of herself first. Popoy admits he never stopped loving Basha but wonders if love is enough.

Popoy and Basha meet at a bench at the university where they both went to college. Popoy tells Basha that he is headed to Qatar for a two-year work contract, something he turned down earlier when they were still together. Popoy reveals that Trisha broke up with him, and Basha apologizes. Popoy tells her it should be him apologizing to her for not giving her what she needed in the relationship. He says it is his turn to find himself, to find what he lost in his heartbreak. They part as friends.

Two years later, Basha is shown working at a building construction site. Popoy approaches her, and asks her out for coffee and dinner. Basha accepts.

Cast

Main cast
 John Lloyd Cruz as Popoy
 Bea Alonzo as Basha

Supporting cast
 Derek Ramsay as Mark
 Maja Salvador as Trisha
 Lauren Young as Bernice
 Dimples Romana as Krizzy
 Bea Saw as Anj
 James Blanco as Kenneth
 Janus del Prado as Chinno
 Ahron Villena as JP
 Nanette Inventor as Nanay Edith
 Al Tantay as Tito Willie
 Bodjie Pascua as Sir Bert
 Nikki Gil as Helen
 Melissa Mendez as Elvie
 Shamaine Buencamino as Rose
 Robert Woods as Francis
 Gee Canlas as Cathy

Awards and recognition

Legacy
Hailed by Filipino audiences as one of the most unforgettable Tagalog romantic movies of all time, the film has continued to be popular for its famous quotes and lines.

Because of this, a novel adaptation was released in June 2015. Two months later, Star Cinema confirmed that a sequel to the film would be released. The sequel, A Second Chance, was released on November 25, 2015, with Garcia-Molina returning as director, and Cruz and Alonzo reprising their roles.

References

External links

2007 films
Films directed by Cathy Garcia-Molina
2007 romantic drama films
Star Cinema films
Filipino-language films
Philippine romantic drama films